Dzień Dobry TVN (eng. Good Morning TVN) is a Polish morning show broadcast on TVN since 2005 every day between 8:00 and 11:30. It features celebrity guests, advice on health, entertainment, cookery and more.

It is presented by four duets: Dorota Wellman with Marcin Prokop and Anna Kalczyńska with Jarosław Kuźniar who are on air from Monday to Friday and  Kinga Rusin with Piotr Kraśko and Magda Mołek with Marcin Meller, who previously hosted with Rusin, host the show at weekends.

The programme is also broadcast on iTVN and TVN HD.

 old logo  dzień dobry tvn.

During the summer holidays it is replaced by Dzień Dobry Wakacje

Presenters

Weekdays

Weekends

Notable moments 
 In 2009 on the occasion of upcoming Christmas the team recorded a carol Believe In Christmas featuring a video. Due to the popularity of the song, in 2010 the carol was renewed with a new video.
 On 28 January 2020 DDTVN was accused worldwide for being unprofessional, disrespectful, racist, and xenophobic. They released material on ranging of The Most Handsome Faces of 2019, in which presenters: Anna Kalczynska-Maciejowska and Andrzej Soltysik were laughing at the appearance of the winner who is Asian. They seemed to be in disbelief that an Asian man could have won, and stated that it must have been because so many Asians voting, insinuating that was the only way an Asian man could have won. The breakfast show was highly criticised for the video during which other presenter was asking people about the winner but showing a photo of a completely different Asian man instead - essentially saying that all Asians look the same. In the video there were hateful comments like comparing the person shown to a cow because of his earrings and questioning their gender. Because of comments on social media worldwide hashtag #dziendobrytvnisoverparty started trending on Twitter.

References 

2. https://nextshark.com/polish-tv-show-disrespect-j-hope-and-jungkook/

Polish television shows
2005 Polish television series debuts
TVN (Polish TV channel) original programming